Two counties (powiats) in Poland may be referred to in English by this name, as in Polish they are both named powiat średzki (which means "powiat of Środa").

Środa Śląska County, in Lower Silesian Voivodeship (SW Poland)
Środa Wielkopolska County, in Greater Poland Voivodeship (west-central Poland)